The Weed wrasse (Halichoeres papilionaceus), also known as Schwatz's wrasse or the seagrass wrasse, is a species of wrasse native to the Pacific ocean from Sumatra to Solomon Islands. This species can reach  in total length. Body is oval, rather elongated and laterally compressed. Adults are green and pinkish.

References

Weed wrasse
Taxa named by Achille Valenciennes
Fish described in 1839